David William Hopkins (October 31, 1897 – October 14, 1968) was a Republican U.S. Representative from Missouri; born in Troy, Doniphan County, Kansas.

Hopkins moved with his parents to Saint Joseph, Missouri in 1899. He graduated from Graceland Academy, Lamoni, Iowa in 1916. In 1920 he graduated from University of Iowa in Iowa City, Iowa where he was a member of Sigma Pi fraternity. He graduated from the University of Missouri in Columbia, Missouri in 1926. He then taught in the high schools of St. Joseph from 1922 until elected to Congress in 1928.  He also served as superintendent of schools of St. Joseph in 1928 and 1929 and the St. Joseph Board of Education from 1937 to 1967. He was defeated in the election of 1932 and returned to private life as an insurance broker.

References

(2007). "David W. Hopkins." Biographical Directory of the US Congress. Retrieved September 21, 2007.

Hopkins, David William
Iowa State University alumni
1897 births
1968 deaths
Graceland University alumni
Politicians from St. Joseph, Missouri
Republican Party members of the United States House of Representatives from Missouri
20th-century American politicians